Cornish is the adjective and demonym associated with Cornwall, the most southwesterly part of the United Kingdom. It may refer to:
 Cornish language, a Brittonic Southwestern  Celtic language of the Indo-European language family, spoken in Cornwall
 Cornish people
 Cornish Americans
 Cornish Australians
 Cornish Canadians
 Cornish diaspora
 Culture of Cornwall

Cornish may also refer to:

Places

United States
 Cornish, Colorado
 Cornish, Maine, a town
 Cornish (CDP), Maine, the primary village
 Cornish, New Hampshire
 Cornish, Oklahoma
 Cornish, Utah
 Cornish Township, Aitkin County, Minnesota
 Cornish Township, Sibley County, Minnesota

People
 Cornish (surname)

Animals and plants
 Cornish Aromatic, apple cultivar
 Cornish chicken
 Cornish chough (Pyrrhocorax pyrrhocorax), a species in the family Corvidae
 Cornish game hen
 Cornish Rex, a breed of cat
 Lucas Terrier, a Cornish breed of dog

Sports
 Cornish Wrestling, the ancient martial art, the "national sport of Cornwall"
 Cornish Pirates, a rugby union team
 Launceston RUFC, known as the Cornish All Blacks

Other uses
 Cornish Art Colony, in Cornish, New Hampshire
 Cornish Assembly
 Cornish College of the Arts, an institution in Seattle, Washington
 Cornish pilot gig, a type of rowing boat
 The Cornish Trilogy, three related novels by Canadian novelist Robertson Davies

See also
 Kornis, a family of the Hungarian nobility
 List of topics related to Cornwall

Language and nationality disambiguation pages